David "Kawika" Crowley (1952 – January 8, 2023) was a Hawaii politician who was the Republican nominee for the United States House of Representatives from Hawaii's 2nd congressional district in the November 2012 election. A colorful and offbeat candidate, he achieved notability as the "homeless handyman" running for Congress. He was the first homeless person in Hawaii  and perhaps any state  to be nominated for Congress on a major party ticket. In 2014, Crowley again won the Republican primary race for the 2nd Congressional district in a contested race.

Early years 
By some accounts Crowley was born in Japan as the son of missionaries; by other accounts he was born in North Carolina and moved to Japan with his parents when he was six months old. He grew up speaking and reading Japanese. When he was in 8th grade, he moved to Hilo, Hawaii and learned for the first time to read English. Crowley spent his teenage years and much of his young adulthood in Hilo. He graduated from Hilo High School in 1969. He describes himself as a "college dropout with a degree in common sense."

Political life 
Crowley ran for Mayor of the Big Island of Hawaii in 1990. In 2012, Crowley defeated Matthew DiGeronimo to win the Republican nomination for Hawaii's 2nd Congressional district race. Crowley achieved 45% of the vote to his opponent's 29%. In the general election, Crowley was easily beaten by Tulsi Gabbard, who became the first Hindu Member of Congress.

For six years, Crowley represented interests of the Hawaii Bar Owners Association, doing lobbyist work at the Hawaii State House. He is known as "the smoking guy" for his lobbying to repeal Hawaii's ban on indoor smoking in stand alone bars, and is never seen without a cigar. He is opposed to the Honolulu Rail Project and to same-sex marriage. He is a supporter of the Hawaiian sovereignty movement, although he has no Hawaiian ancestry.

Electoral history

Personal life 
Divorced with three children, Crowley lived for a number of years as a single parent. He is a handyman and painter who lives out of his car. He earns about $15,000 a year, putting him in the ranks of the working homeless.

He claims to be a co-writer of the song Hawaiʻi '78 and to have a history in the Hawaiian Music industry.

References 

Hawaii Republicans
Hawaii politicians of Japanese descent
Living people
Musicians from Hawaii
1952 births